A total lunar eclipse took place on 4 April 2015. It is the former of two total lunar eclipses in 2015, and the third in a tetrad (four total lunar eclipses in series). Other eclipses in the tetrad are those of 15 April 2014, 8 October 2014, and 28 September 2015.

This is the 30th member of Lunar Saros 132, and the first total eclipse. The previous event was the March 1997 lunar eclipse, being slightly partial.

Duration
Totality lasted only 4 minutes and 43 seconds, making it the shortest lunar totality in almost five centuries since 17 October 1529 (which lasted 1 minute and 42 seconds). It was claimed by some that due to the oblateness of the Earth, it may have actually just been a partial eclipse. It was the sixth total lunar eclipse out of nine with totality under 5 minutes in a five millennium period between 2,000 BC and 3,000 AD. The eclipsed moon was 12.9% smaller in apparent diameter than the supermoon September 2015 lunar eclipse, measured as 29.66' and 33.47' in diameter from the center of the earth. It occurred 3 days past apogee at 29.42'.

Visibility 
The eclipse was visible across the Pacific, including all of Australia and New Zealand. It was visible near sunrise for North America, and after sunset for eastern Asia including India.

Background 

A lunar eclipse occurs when the Moon passes within Earth's umbra (shadow). As the eclipse begins, Earth's shadow first darkens the Moon slightly. Then, the shadow begins to "cover" part of the Moon, turning it a dark red-brown color (typically - the color can vary based on atmospheric conditions). The Moon appears to be reddish because of Rayleigh scattering (the same effect that causes sunsets to appear reddish) and the refraction of that light by Earth's atmosphere into its umbra.

The following simulation shows the approximate appearance of the Moon passing through Earth's shadow. The Moon's brightness is exaggerated within the umbral shadow. The southern portion of the Moon will be closest to the center of the shadow, making it darkest, and most red in appearance.

Gallery

Timing

† The Moon was not visible during this part of the eclipse in this time zone.

Related eclipses

Eclipses of 2015 
 A total solar eclipse on 20 March.
 A total lunar eclipse on 4 April.
 A partial solar eclipse on 13 September.
 A total lunar eclipse on 28 September.

Half-Saros cycle
A lunar eclipse will be preceded and followed by solar eclipses by 9 years and 5.5 days (a half saros). This lunar eclipse is related to two total solar eclipses of solar saros 139.

Lunar year series 
The eclipse is the one of four lunar eclipses in a short-lived series at the ascending node of the moon's orbit.

The lunar year series repeats after 12 lunations, or 354 days (shifting back about 10 days in sequential years). Because of the date shift, the Earth's shadow will be about 11 degrees west in sequential events.

Saros series

Tzolkinex 
 Preceded: Lunar eclipse of February 20-21, 2008

 Followed: Lunar eclipse of May 15-16, 2022

See also 
List of lunar eclipses and List of 21st-century lunar eclipses

Notes

External links

 
 Hermit Eclipse: Total Lunar Eclipse: April 4, 2015
 Mattastro.com Total Lunar Eclipse: April 4, 2015
 Full Moon in Earth's Shadow APOD 2015 April 8

2015-04
2015 in science
April 2015 events